Asirgarh Fort is an Indian fortress (qila) situated in the Satpura Range about  north of the city of Burhanpur, in the Indian state of Madhya Pradesh. Because the fortress commands a pass through the Satpuras connecting the valleys of the Narmada and Tapti rivers, one of the most important routes from northern India to the Deccan, it was known as the "key to the Deccan". During the Mughal Era, it was considered that the Deccan started here while the empire from Asirgarh to Delhi was considered Hindustan.

History 

The Asirgarh fort is said to have been built by a king named Asa Ahir in the early 15th century. He was murdered by Nasir Khan of Khandesh.

Nasir Khan's descendant Miran Bahadur Khan (1596–1600) declared his independence and refused to pay homage to the Mughal emperor Akbar and his son Daniyal. Akbar marched towards Burhanpur in 1599 and occupied the city. Akbar then besieged Asirgarh fort and captured it on 17 January 1601.

During the Second Anglo-Maratha War, on 18October 1803, Company forces took the pettah of Asigarh with a loss of two killed and five wounded. The fort's garrison subsequently surrendered on the 21st after the attackers had erected a battery.

Toward the end of the Third Anglo-Maratha War in early 1819, most Maratha forts had been captured by the British, with the lone holdout being Asirgarh Fort, which was under the command of qiladar Jeswant Rao Lar. In March of that year, a massive British contingent laid siege to Asirgarh, capturing and occupying the town next to the fort to serve as a temporary base of operations. The 1,200-strong garrison was subject to constant artillery bombardments before the British launched an assault, which led to the fort's capture on 9 April. With the capture of Asirgarh Fort, the British victory in the conflict was complete and all military operations ceased.

Architecture 
The architecture of the fort was influenced by the Mughals, an amalgamation of Islamic, Persian, Turkish and Indian styles. There are three man made ponds to provide a water supply.

There is a temple known as Gupteshwar Mahadev Mandir, dedicated to the Hindu deity Shiva. There is a local legend that Ashwatthama, a character in the Indian epic Mahābhārata, used to come to this temple to worship and offer flowers each morning to Lord Shiva.

There is a ruined mosque with minarets known as Asir Masjid inside the Fort. Apart from the Hindu and Muslim architecture, some ruins are of British origin and there are also British graves. This fort has been deserted following the departure of the British.

References

External links 

 Haunted Fort Of Asirgarh – Truth Revealed (video on YouTube)
 Asirgarh Fort
 असीरगढ किला, खंडवा

Forts in Madhya Pradesh
Burhanpur district
Mountain passes of Madhya Pradesh
Former capital cities in India